Rollin Howell (born March 24, 1929) was an American politician in the state of Iowa.

Howell was born in Rockford, Iowa. He is a farmer. Howell served in the Iowa House of Representatives from 1973 to 1983 as a Democrat.

References

Living people
1929 births
Democratic Party members of the Iowa House of Representatives
People from Floyd County, Iowa
Farmers from Iowa